Ushuaia is the fifteenth studio album by the Belgian-Dutch girl group K3. It is the second album with the new formation of K3, which was formed in the 2015 television show K3 zoekt K3 (K3 searches for K3). The album was scheduled for release on 10 November 2016 by Studio 100. The album features thirteen new songs and twelve existing K3-songs re-recorded by the new members.

Three singles were released to promote the album. The lead single, "Ushuaia", was released on 3 June 2016. "Iedereen K3 (Everyone K3)" was released on 12 August 2016.

The cover of the album attracted much attention, due to the face of Marthe De Pillecyn. In the first pictures that came out, the image was heavily photoshopped.

Track listing

Charts

Weekly charts

Year-end charts

Certifications

References

2016 albums
K3 (band) albums